Hill Auditorium is the largest performance venue on the University of Michigan campus, in Ann Arbor, Michigan. The auditorium was named in honor of Arthur Hill (1847-1909), who served as a regent of the university from 1901 to 1909. He bequeathed $200,000 (equivalent to $ million in ) to the university for the construction of a venue for lectures, musical performances, and other large productions. Opened in 1913, the auditorium was designed by Albert Kahn and Associates. It was renovated by the same firm beginning in 2002 and was re-opened in 2004.

With seating for up to 3,538 (originally 4,100 prior to the 2004 renovation) audience members, Hill is used for large productions on campus.

Design concept

Carol Rose Kahn, the architect's granddaughter, recounted that her grandfather had set out to develop a hall with perfect acoustics. The brief was to design an auditorium that would seat five thousand people, where they could hear from every seat. The only known previous example was the Mormon Tabernacle where it was said that one could hear a pin drop from the stage to the top balcony, although the chamber suffered from excess reverberation.

Albert Kahn wrote to Hugh Tallant, partner of Henry Beaumont Herts, asking if it would be possible to build an auditorium for five thousand people, where they'd hear from every seat. Tallant responded, but only after several months had elapsed, to the affirmative; so Tallant designed the acoustics. The result was an auditorium in the shape of a megaphone.

The granddaughter said: "Hill Auditorium was nearly finished when I was fourteen or so. My father [Albert Kahn's son] and I went out to Ann Arbor. Father stood up in the last seat of the second balcony, and I went down on the stage. On my word of honor, I dropped a pin and he heard it."

Renovation

The University of Michigan website that describes the $33.5 million (equivalent to $51.3 million USD in 2022) Hill Auditorium refurbishing and restoration, completed in 2004, states:

"When it opened in 1913, Hill Auditorium was hailed as a 'monument to perfect acoustics.' The excellent acoustics, a result of collaboration by architect Albert Kahn with noted acoustical engineer Hugh Tallant, are known world-wide and have made the auditorium a favorite venue for legions of famous musicians and other artists, as well as numerous noted speakers."

"Careful attention will be given throughout the renovation to maintaining the acoustic quality of Hill, said Henry Baier, associate vice president for facilities and operations. In addition, further work will be done to reduce street and lobby noise by building a "sound lock" between the lobby and the auditorium."

Campus and local users
The building routinely hosts performances given by the Ann Arbor Symphony Orchestra and the School of Music's various ensembles, including the University of Michigan Symphony Orchestra, University of Michigan Philharmonia Orchestra, University of Michigan Concert Band, University of Michigan Symphony Band, and University of Michigan Choirs, as well as the mostly non-major ensembles such as the University of Michigan Arts Chorale, the Campus Symphony Orchestra, Campus Bands, the Michigan Marching Band, and the Men's Glee Club and Women's Glee Club.

The building has occasionally hosted musical events for the local Pioneer High School. The most recent event the venue has hosted that has included the school has been the 2022 Choral Cavalcade on March 11, 2022. The Choral Cavalcade is  a Choir Concert event that includes the choirs of multiple Middle and High Schools that are in the area. The 2022 event hosted the choirs of the local Tappan and Slauson Middle Schools alongside Pioneer High School.

The auditorium is also host to the University of Michigan Law School graduation each May. In addition, the auditorium serves as the host for two outside schools, the Detroit Catholic Central High School and Father Gabriel Richard Ann Arbor, graduation ceremonies.

Touring performances
Michigan's University Musical Society presents dance, classical music, popular music, and readings by world-renowned artists at Hill Auditorium. Through the years, Hill's oval-shaped stage has seen performances by Rachmaninoff, the Denishawn Dance Company, the Vienna Philharmonic, the Berlin Philharmonic, the Boston Symphony, the Chicago Symphony Orchestra, London Philharmonic Orchestra, the Leningrad Philharmonic, Jan Kubelik, Jascha Heifetz, Eugène Ysaÿe, Ravi Shankar, Enrico Caruso, Joan Sutherland, Robert Frost, Van Cliburn, Yo-Yo Ma, Helen Hayes, Benny Goodman, Harry Chapin, Wynton Marsalis, Elton John, and the Grateful Dead, among others. 

The Folk Festival, a multiple artist Folk-Genre Musical Festival held by a local Jazz/Live Performance Musical bar known as The Ark, has been hosted at Hill Auditorium 18 times since 2005. As of 2022, the last live performance was held here on Friday, January 31st and Saturday February 1st, 2020. The Musical Guests for the event were Ingrid Michaelson, The Lone Bellow, Cedric Burnside, Rainbow Girls, Elliott BROOD, with Calexico and Iron & Wine as the final act, playing the song Father Mountain from their 2019 musical collaboration studio album, Years to Burn. Ann Arbor local and Guitarist Willy Porter, the concert's MC, was a musical guest during intermissions while old performers were clearing out and the next act was being set up.

See also
List of concert halls

References

External links
Grateful Dead Concert December 14, 1971
Hill Auditorium renovation
UM School of Music - Hill Auditorium

University of Michigan campus
Performing arts centers in Michigan
Albert Kahn (architect) buildings
Music venues completed in 1913
Tourist attractions in Ann Arbor, Michigan
1913 establishments in Michigan
Concert halls in Michigan